William Tyrell Quinn (May 6, 1912 – April 29, 1994) was an American film actor.

Early years 
Quinn was born on May 6, 1912, in New York City. His father, Edward Quinn, was a supervisor in the United States Shipping Board's copying department. His mother, Lillian Tyrrell, was an actress in films and a chorus girl on Broadway. He performed with his older brothers in a children's act in vaudeville.

Career 
As a teenager Quinn worked in films in New York City. He performed with touring stock theater companies in the 1920s.

Quinn began working on radio around 1934. He starred as a detective on Little Herman on ABC in the late 1940s. Other radio programs on which he appeared included Counterspy, The FBI in Peace and War, Gangbusters, and Mr. District Attorney.

Quinn appeared in more than 150 acting roles over seven decades, starting in the 1920s in silent films and ending in 1989 in Star Trek V: The Final Frontier. He was a regular on Archie Bunker's Place. His other television roles include The Odd Couple, in which he played the recurring role of the roommates' physician, Dr. Melnitz; The Rifleman as Sweeney, the bartender; McHale's Navy; and Mary's father in The Mary Tyler Moore Show. In 1971, he was featured in the Universal Pictures movie How to Frame a Figg starring Don Knotts. He appeared in 
the 1961, Perry Mason, season 4, episode 22 "The Case of the Cowardly Lion" as Judge 1.  He played Warden Sloan in the 1969 season 2 episode 2 "Six Hours to Live" of Land of the Giants.

Quinn also played in Barnaby Jones, in the episode titled "Murder Once Removed" (January 21, 1975).

He played Judge Antonio Runzuli in Bustin' Loose starring Richard Pryor and Cicely Tyson.

He was also known for his regular appearances on The Rifleman as Frank Sweeney, the North Fork Saloon bartender.

Personal life and death 
Quinn married Mary Catherine Roden in 1942, and they had three daughters. One of those is Virginia "Ginnie" Quinn Newhart, wife of comedian Bob Newhart, on whose sitcoms, Newhart and The Bob Newhart Show,  Quinn occasionally appeared in small supporting roles.

Quinn died on April 29, 1994, at the age of 81 in Camarillo, California of natural causes. He is buried in San Fernando Mission Cemetery.

Filmography

No Mother to Guide Her (1923) - Billy Mills, as a child
The New School Teacher (1924) - Pupil 
The Last Angry Man (1959) - Andrew Lord (uncredited)
The Flying Fontaines (1959) - Al Bartlett (uncredited)
The Mountain Road (1960) - Col. Magnusson
From the Terrace (1960) - Lawrence Von Elm (uncredited)
Cry for Happy (1961) - Alan Lyman
Go Naked in the World (1961) - Pete's Doctor (uncredited)
The Young Savages (1961) - Police Capt. Larsen (uncredited)
Ada (1961) - Tom De Paul - Committee Man (uncredited)
Five Finger Exercise (1962) - Salesman
Advise & Consent (1962) - Senator Paul Hendershot
The Birds (1963) -  Sam - man in Diner
It Happened at the World's Fair (1963) - Man Leaving Dispensary (uncredited)
Brainstorm (1965) - Psychiatrist at Sanity Hearing (uncredited)
Mirage (1965) - Eddie - Bartender (uncredited)
Dark Intruder (1965) - The Neighbor
When the Boys Meet the Girls (1965) - Dean of Colby
Penelope (1966) - Bank Executive (uncredited)
The Ballad of Josie (1967) - Bobbitt (uncredited)
Doctor, You've Got to Be Kidding! (1967) - Executive at Meeting (uncredited)
The Reluctant Astronaut (1967) - Captain Ferguson (uncredited)
The Shakiest Gun in the West (1968) - U.S. Marshal Arthur Bates (uncredited)
Love Is a Funny Thing (1969) - Le passager
How to Frame a Figg (1971) - Asst. Atty. Gen. John Carmoni
The Mad Bomber (1973) - Sgt. Quinn
Ace Eli and Rodger of the Skies (1973) - Mortician
Hearts of the West (1975) - Customer at Cafe Rio (uncredited)
Psychic Killer (1975) - Hospital Coroner
Matilda (1978) - Donohue
Bustin' Loose (1981) - Judge Antonio Runzuli
Dead & Buried (1981) - Ernie
Twilight Zone: The Movie (1983) - Mr. Leo Conroy (Segment#2)
Lucky Stiff (1988) - Emmet Kassler
Star Trek V: The Final Frontier (1989) - David McCoy, Dr. Leonard McCoy's father (his final film role)

References

External links

 

1912 births
1994 deaths
American male television actors
American male film actors
Burials at San Fernando Mission Cemetery
20th-century American male actors
Male actors from New York City